Sugar Hill Records may refer to:

Sugar Hill Records (hip hop label), specializing in rap music
Sugar Hill Records, specializing in bluegrass and country music

See also 
 SugarHill Recording Studios, a Texas recording studio
 The Sugarhill Gang, a band founded by former members of the hip hop label
 Sugar Hill